Patience Higgins is a New York-based jazz saxophonist, flutist, and multi-reed musician. He also plays clarinet, oboe, and English horn. He has performed with Duke Ellington Orchestra, Barry Harris, Archie Shepp, Jimmy Scott, Stevie Wonder, Ray Charles, Dee Dee Bridgewater, Paquito D’Rivera, Cleo Laine, and The Sugar Hill Jazz Quartet. Higgins has a history as a Broadway musician. He is a music educator and teaches at the New York Jazz Workshop Music School. Higgins has toured with the tour with Duke Ellington and Count Basie Orchestras.

In 1998 he was featured artist playing saxophone and flute for double Grammy Award-winning recording Dee Dee Bridgewater's Dear Ella.

Higgins along with the Sugar Hill Quartet were the house band for the Lenox Lounge, and regular Monday night sessions at St. Nick's Pub in Harlem. His 1998 album 'Live in Harlem' documents Monday night sessions at St. Nick's Pub.

Career
Higgins has also performed with the Duke Ellington Band under the direction of Mercer Ellington,  and Paul Ellington. He has been a member of the Duke Ellington Band for over twenty years. He has toured and recorded with Frank Foster, Rodney Kendrick, Yoko Ono, Cleo Laine and The Sugar Hill Jazz Quartet, Vanessa Rubin, Dee Dee Bridgewater, The Pointer Sisters, Don Byron, Hamiett Bluiett, The Boys Choir of Harlem, Nicolas Payton, David Murray, Aretha Franklin, Savion Glover, Ray Charles, Lionel Hampton, Sam Rivers, Charles Tolliver, Sam and Dave, Bobby Watson & Tailor Made, Archie Shepp, Wilson Pickett, Barry Harris, Muhal Richard Abrams, Stevie Wonder, Paquito D’Rivera, James Zollar, Bobby Short, Chip White, Wilson Pickett, Joey DeFrancesco,  Kiane Zawadi, Eli Fountain, Leopaldo Fleming.

Discography

Album appearances

Movie Soundtracks
 The Cotton Club
School Daze
 Awakenings
Soul to Soul
 Baby Boy

Theater Credits
 AVE Q, DREAMGIRLS 
 THE WIZ
 AIN’T MISBHEVIN’
 BUBBLING BROWN SUGAR
 BLACK & BLUE
 RUNAWAYS
 HAIR 
 SOPHISTICATED LADIES 
 JELLY’S LAST JAM 
 5 GUYS NAMED MOE
 CHICAGO

Jazz Festivals
 NORTH SEA
 PORI
 MONTREAUX
 JVC
 NANCY
 WILLASAU
 VIENNE
 BERLIN
 PLAY BOY
 MONTEREY
 NEWPORT
 GLASKOW
 COPENHAGEN
 MONTREAL
 JAZZ HERITAGE in New Orleans.
 CHARLIE PARKER JAZZ FESTIVAL (in New York City)

References

External links
Duke Ellington & his orchestra - Take the 'A' train (live in Berlin 1969)
Lenox Lounge, Sugar Hill Quartet, Patience Higgins, Dave Gibson, George Caldwell, Andy Mc Cloud, Marcus Percianni, Harlem N.Y.
 Patience Higgins Sugar Hill Quartet Live @ Lenox Lounge
Playlists featuring Patience Higgins
New York Jazz Workshop Faculty Patience Higgins

Living people
American jazz educators
African-American saxophonists
African-American jazz musicians
American jazz tenor saxophonists
American male saxophonists
Bebop saxophonists
Musicians from New York City
Swing saxophonists
20th-century American saxophonists
Jazz musicians from New York (state)
21st-century American saxophonists
Educators from New York City
20th-century American male musicians
21st-century American male musicians
American male jazz musicians
Year of birth missing (living people)
Mapleshade Records artists
20th-century African-American musicians
21st-century African-American musicians